Syed Refat Ahmed is a justice of the Bangladesh Supreme Court and former judge of the Bangladesh High Court.

Early life
Ahmed studied law at the Wadham College of Oxford University in 1983. He studied International Relations at The Fletcher School of Law and Diplomacy of Tufts University. His father, Barrister Syed Ishtiaq Ahmed, was a former attorney general of Bangladesh. His mother, Dr. Sufia Ahmed, was a National Professor of Islamic Studies at Dhaka University.

Career
Ahmed is a justice of the Bangladesh High Court. In 2018, he was part of a divided bench on the question of Khaleda Zia participating in the general election. He had asked the Election Commission to accept the nomination of former Prime Minister Khaleda Zia while his fellow judge on the bench, Justice Iqbal Kabir, disagreed and blocked the participation of Khaleda Zia. On 28 July 2019, High Court bench led by him banned the marketing of pasteurized milk by 14 companies. He was promoted to the Supreme Court of Bangladesh in 2019.

References

Alumni of the University of Oxford
The Fletcher School at Tufts University alumni
20th-century Bangladeshi lawyers
Year of birth missing (living people)
Living people
21st-century Bangladeshi judges